0:12 Revolution in Just Listening is the third studio album to be released by American metalcore band Coalesce, which was released on November 16, 1999 through Relapse Records. The album was recorded and released posthumously, as the group broke up prior after touring troubles and made the album as they were obliged to do so by contract. Hydra Head Records issued the vinyl edition of the album, and in 2008 Relapse released a remastered version of the album under the title 012:2. The album was included in Decibel Magazines "Hall of Fame" in 2008.

Writing and recording 
Prior to the album's creation, the band was in the middle of a two-legged tour across the United States. The first leg in the East Coast, the second in the West Coast. One of the destinations for the West Coast leg of the tour was in Idaho, and by the time the group reached that state, the van broke down. This ultimately resulted in their disbandment.

Because the group already received an advancement check from Relapse, they decided to record one last album to let the label issue. Guitarist Jes Steineger wrote all his parts in the span of three days on an acoustic guitar. The album was produced within a weekend, and Relapse originally sold it as an EP due to its short length.

Track listing

Personnel

Band 
 Sean Ingram – Vocals, Art direction, Design
 James Dewees – Drums
 Jes Steineger – Guitar
 Nathan Ellis – Bass

Production 
 Ed Rose – Producer, Mixing
 Matthew F. Jacobson – Executive producer
 Dave Shirk – Mastering
 Scott Hull – Mastering

Design 
 Don Clark – Design
 Jason Hellmann – Photography
 Dan Henk – Cover Art

References 

Coalesce (band) albums
1999 albums
Relapse Records albums
Hydra Head Records albums
Albums produced by Ed Rose